Prudence Mary Fitzgerald, (18 January 19306 September 2018) was an English television director and producer. She was known for directing and producing numerous British TV series including Dr. Finlay's Casebook, The Expert, The Shadow of the Tower, 1990 and the 1979 series A Family Affair. She was also a programme co-ordinator for the 1974 BBC TV mini-series Fall of Eagles.

Life and career
Prudence Fitzgerald was born in Stafford in 1930 to Kevin Columba Fitzgerald, a chemical company advisor and Vida Lamb. She started working in television in the early 1960s, beginning her directing career at the BBC in 1961. She worked on several TV movies and series there before making her name as a director of the hugely popular Dr. Finlay's Casebook in 1965-1966. She was the most prolific director on the BBC series, The Expert, helming eighteen of the sixty-two episodes. It starred Marius Goring as the title character, Professor John Hardy. It was the first series to feature a forensic pathologist in the lead role as an investigator, working with police. It had an influence on such later shows as Quincy, M.E. and CSI: Crime Scene Investigation. Several of the series on which she worked, including The Expert and The Brothers, were created by the prolific producing duo Gerard Glaister and N.J. Crisp.

Fitzgerald met her future husband Marius Goring when she chose him from his photo in a casting directory for a part on The Expert. Goring's second wife, the German actress Lucie Mannheim, died in 1976. Marius Goring and Prudence Fitzgerald married on 21 May 1977. They shared a seventeenth-century house in London's Hampton Court that looked out onto a royal park, before moving to the village of Rushlake Green in East Sussex, where they lived for the rest of their lives. Marius Goring died of cancer in 1998 and Prudence survived him by twenty years, dying on 6 September 2018. They are buried together in the churchyard of St Mary the Virgin, Warbleton, East Sussex.

Filmography

 The Big Boys (1961) TV movie – producer
 Studio 4 (1962) TV series – producer/director of 3 episodes
 Crying Down the Lane (1962) TV mini-series – producer/director of 6 episodes
 Moonstrike (1963) TV series - director of 2 episodes
 Festival (1963–64) TV series – director of 2 episodes
 First Night (1964) TV series – director of 1 episode
 Detective (1964) TV series – director of 1 episode
 Dr. Finlay's Casebook (1965–66) TV series - director of 14 episodes
 This Man Craig (1966–67) TV series – director of 7 episodes
 Champion House (1967) TV series – director of 3 episodes
 The Revenue Men (1967–68) TV series – director of 6 episodes
 The Expert (1968–1976) TV series – director of 18 episodes
 Paul Temple (1970) TV series - director of 1 episode
 The View from Daniel Pike (1971) TV series – director of 2 episodes
 The Shadow of the Tower (1972) TV series – director of 4 episodes
 The Brothers (1972) TV series – director of 2 episodes
 Crown Court (1974) TV series – director of 2 episodes
 Fall of Eagles (1974) TV mini-series – programme co-ordinator of 3 episodes
 1990 (1977–78) TV series – producer of 16 episodes
 A Family Affair (1979) TV series - producer of 10 episodes/director of 1 episode
 Juno and the Paycock (1980) TV movie – producer
 Out of Order (1984) TV movie – producer

References

External links

1930 births
2018 deaths
English television producers
English television directors
British women television directors
British women television producers
People from Stafford
People from Heathfield, East Sussex
People from Warbleton